Rami Shaaban (born 30 June 1975) is a Swedish former professional footballer who played as goalkeeper. During a career that spanned between 1994 and 2012, he is best remembered for representing Djurgårdens IF, Arsenal, Fredrikstad, and Hammarby IF. A full international between 2006 and 2008, he won 16 caps for the Sweden national team and represented his country at the 2006 FIFA World Cup and UEFA Euro 2008.

Early life
Shaaban was born in Solna, Stockholm. He is the son of an Egyptian father and a Finnish mother.

Club career

Early career
Shaaban started his senior career at local club Saltsjöbadens IF before moving to Cairo to play for Zamalek and Ittihad Osman, while also studying at university. Following his time in Egypt, Shaaban returned to Sweden in 1997 and joined Nacka FF, a club based close to where he grew up. After a string of impressive performances, he was asked to join Swedish Allsvenskan outfit Djurgården where he spent two seasons. In August 2002, Shaaban earned a move to Arsenal.

Arsenal
In August 2002, Shaaban joined Arsenal as a potential replacement for David Seaman. When Seaman was injured, Shaaban played in two matches in the UEFA Champions League at home against PSV and away against Roma, as well as in three matches in the Premier League, including a North London Derby victory against rivals Tottenham Hotspur. Shaaban broke his leg during training on Christmas Eve 2002, ultimately sidelining himself for the rest of the season.  When Seaman left Arsenal in the summer of 2003 Arsène Wenger signed Jens Lehmann, who played every match that season as Arsenal went undefeated for the entire 2003–04 league season. Shaaban was plagued by injuries and failed to become Arsenal's first-choice keeper. In January 2004, Shaaban was loaned to West Ham United for a month, but did not make any appearances for the Hammers. He returned to Arsenal after his loan spell and due to an injury to Stuart Taylor he was on the bench for a number of league games as Arsenal completed their Invincibles season. He was released by Arsenal at the end of that season.

Other clubs
In February 2005, he signed for Brighton & Hove Albion on non-contract terms, making his debut in a 2–1 victory over Sunderland, and signed a short-term contract lasting until the end of the season days later. After his contract expired he was released on a free transfer and had a trial at Dundee United, playing his only match as United beat Sheffield Wednesday to win the City of Discovery Cup. He also had a trial at Bristol City. However, Shaaban could not agree terms and was snapped up by Fredrikstad FK.

Hammarby IF and retirement 
On 12 February 2008, Shaaban signed a five-year contract with Swedish team Hammarby IF. In 2012, he announced his retirement from professional football.

International career

In 2002, shortly after his move to Arsenal, Shaaban was linked to be called up by the Egypt national football team, however this never materialised. Shaaban was called up to the Sweden squad for the 2006 World Cup, although he did not have an international cap to his name. He made his debut in the warm up game with Finland as a substitute, coming on for 45 minutes and keeping a clean sheet in a 0–0 draw. On 10 June 2006, he played in the 2006 World Cup contest against Trinidad and Tobago after starter Andreas Isaksson was hit by a shot in his face and hit the ground with his head two days before the match.

He also played four games in the Euro 2008 qualifiers, in which he kept a vital clean sheet against Spain national football team, and was also a member of the nation's final stage squad.

Personal life
Shaaban grew up in Solna, Stockholm with a Finnish mother and an Egyptian father. As a result, he has both Swedish and Egyptian citizenship. He was raised as a Muslim. In his late teens to early twenties, Shaaban lived in Cairo, where he played football and attended university. Prior to joining Arsenal, he also worked as a mountain explosives specialist.

Shaaban has one son, Gabriel, born 2002 to his ex-wife. Several years after his divorce, he began dating a makeup artist named Frida. Although they are not married, the two have a son Noah, born in August 2008. Shaaban made a move to Hammarby partly to be close to Gabriel. He currently lives in a large lake house with his son and wife.

Reporters often credit Shaaban for remaining down-to-earth. Shaaban claims he has friends ranging from sheet metal workers to footballers, such as Freddie Ljungberg: Ljungberg and Shaaban remain close after becoming friends whilst at Arsenal. The two are often seen drinking coffee together.

Shaaban is known for his love of coffee; he is often seen with a cup of coffee in his hand. He once said, "I dare not keep count of how many cups I drink per day. But mom is actually even worse."

Career statistics

International

Honours
Djurgårdens IF
Allsvenskan: 2002
Superettan: 2000
Svenska Cupen: 2002

Fredrikstad FK
Norwegian Football Cup: 2006

Individual
Swedish Goalkeeper of the Year: 2006, 2007

References

External links

 
 Hammarby IF bio
 
 

1975 births
Living people
2006 FIFA World Cup players
UEFA Euro 2008 players
Allsvenskan players
Arsenal F.C. players
Brighton & Hove Albion F.C. players
Djurgårdens IF Fotboll players
Expatriate footballers in England
Expatriate footballers in Norway
Association football goalkeepers
Fredrikstad FK players
Hammarby Fotboll players
Eliteserien players
Footballers from Stockholm
Premier League players
Swedish people of Egyptian descent
Swedish sportspeople of African descent
Swedish people of Finnish descent
Swedish expatriate sportspeople in England
Swedish expatriate footballers
Swedish footballers
Sweden international footballers
Sweden under-21 international footballers
West Ham United F.C. players
Zamalek SC players
Egyptian Premier League players